Nabil Husein Said Amin Al Rasyidi (born 4 June 1994) commonly known as Nabil Husein is an Indonesian businessman from Samarinda, East Kalimantan.

As Persisam Putra Samarinda crisis in 2014, with support by Pusamania (former Persisam Putra's supporters group), Nabil's establish a football club named Borneo F.C., by acquiring license of Perseba Super Bangkalan and officiate as its president.

Personal life 
Nabil is Indonesian of Yemeni descent. His father Said Amin, is former leader of East Kalimantan branch of Pemuda Pancasila organization.

References 

1993 births
Living people